Los Angeles High School is the oldest public high school in the Southern California Region and in the Los Angeles Unified School District. Its colors are royal blue and white and the teams are called the Romans.

Los Angeles High School is a public secondary high school, enrolling an estimated 2,000 students in grades 9–12. After operating on a year-round basis consisting of three tracks for ten years, it was restored to a traditional calendar in 2010. Los Angeles High School receives accreditation approval from the Western Association of Schools and Colleges (WASC). Concurrent enrollment programs, provided in large by the Los Angeles Unified School District and the Los Angeles Community College District, are offered with West Los Angeles College, Los Angeles Trade–Technical College, Los Angeles City College, or Santa Monica College.

Los Angeles High School is a large, urban, inner-city school located in the Mid-Wilshire District of Los Angeles. The attendance boundary consists of a contrasting spectrum of economic diversity ranging from affluent Hancock Park and Lafayette Square to the low-income, densely populated immigrant community of Koreatown. Within the school is a College Incentive Magnet Program. Forty-four percent of the student population is identified as LEP, or Limited English Proficient. Currently, 66% of the students are identified as eligible to receive supplemental instructional services and materials through the Federal Title I Program.

The magnet high school has a university preparatory secondary high school program and a "school within a school." First established as a part of student integration services in the 1970s, the Los Angeles High School Math/Science/Technology magnet prepares students with an intensive, rigorous course load in order to better prepare them for university entrance. There are 317 students enrolled in the magnet program, grades 9-12.

Typically, the senior class has approximately 50% of seniors entering into four-year universities and schools. The magnet senior class typically has 90% of its senior class entering into four-year colleges and universities.

History

Early buildings commissioned to house the Los Angeles High School were among the architectural jewels of the city, and were strategically placed at the summit of a hill, the easier to be pointed to with pride. One of the school's long standing mottos is "Always a hill, always a tower, always a timepiece."

Construction on Los Angeles' first public high school, (the Jesuit Loyola High School is older) began on July 19, 1872, at the former site of Central School on what was then known as Poundcake Hill, at the southeast corner of Fort Street (later Broadway), which the front of the school faced, and Temple Street, with the back of the school to New High Street (later Spring Street). As it was on the hill, a few hundred feet from the streets below, steep wooden stairways led up to the schoolyard.

The two-story wooden structure was so big and grand, the finest school south of San Francisco at that time, with classic lines and a tower with a clock in it, that people traveled from miles around to see it. The teachers liked the wide corridors, walnut banisters, generous windows and the transoms over the doors.

The schoolhouse was completed at a cost of $20,000 in 1873. Nearby, in succession, was the Court House, the City Hall, the Jones-Lindley Market and the Post Office. The first principal was Rev. Dr. William T. Lucky (1821–1876) and the first graduating class, in 1875, consisted of seven students. In 1879, a natural science club, the Star and Crescent Society, was founded at LAHS and consisted then of the entire student body. It soon left its specific focus on science and became a de facto student government and organizational body.

In 1887, the decision was made to move the high school building to Sand Street (later California Street, now part of the Hollywood Freeway), just to the west of North Hill Street and below the south side of Fort Moore Hill, in order for the Los Angeles County Courthouse to be built on Poundcake Hill. The contractor, Mr. Hickam, said he could do the job with scaffolding, rollers, horses and workmen. But his bid turned out to be too low. He lost a considerable amount of money because of his elaborate preparations, including the high wooden trestle which carried the building over the intersection of Temple and Fort Street. Hickam managed to get the schoolhouse halfway up Temple Street when he ran out of money and left it right in the middle of the street. It was there for a good while. They jacked it up on scaffolding high enough for the Temple Street street cars to run under it. Finally, they got it moved up to its new location on Sand Street, where LAHS students and faculty remained until the second high school was built a few years later.

The original schoolhouse remained at the Sand Street (California Street) site for many years, while in continuous use. After the high school moved out, it became a school for the lower grades. It went completely unharmed by the Long Beach earthquake in 1933, which did a lot of damage to the newer buildings in downtown. By April 1936, nearly 300 children attended school there.

In 1890, construction began on a new red brick schoolhouse facing North Hill Street on Fort Moore Hill, between Sand Street and Bellevue Avenue (later Sunset Boulevard, now Cesar Chavez Avenue), at coordinates , which was a short distance from the older wooden one then facing Sand Street below.

That same year, the Los Angeles City High School District was formed. It served students of LAHS while the Los Angeles City School District and various other elementary school districts served elementary and junior high school students.

This second location atop a hill was completed in 1891 and LAHS moved in. It was an enormous building for its time. The new high school was built on part of the site of the abandoned Fort Moore Hill Cemetery, the first Protestant cemetery in Los Angeles, which was spread over the slopes of the hill. It had become neglected, practically unattended and desecrated by grave robbing vandals. The Board of Education purchased the property from the city in 1884, and other portions of land were sold as residential lots. The city neglected to remove the remains and clear away the grave sites and some LAHS students in the 1890s thought it was "fun" to sit and eat their lunch while they leaned against a tombstone.

At a meeting regarding the improvement of the school grounds on June 4, 1896, the committee was directed to wait on the Board of Education the following Monday evening to secure the cooperation of the board in having dirt being taken from the Hill Street cut used in filling up the grounds of the high school, so that shrubbery could be grown about the building. LAHS was the only high school in Los Angeles until 1905.

In 1917, the school moved to its current location on Olympic Boulevard, and Rimpau, with 1,937 students. An edifice was erected that became an international cultural landmark for the famed school. To insure a permanently beautiful vista for their contemplation, and to honor classmates who had fallen in World War I, the students purchased the land across the street for the creation of a tree-filled memorial park.

Actual student government was instituted at LAHS in the early 1900s, eliminating one of the main reasons for Star and Crescent's existence. Meanwhile, as the size of the student body increased over years, the lower grades were successively dropped from Star and Crescent until by 1935 only seniors were members. Star and Crescent probably disappeared after World War II, but it is difficult to determine the exact year since no one at the school today can say when it ended. In particular, yearbooks were published during the years of America's involvement in that war, so it seems likely it might have disappeared after the war years. In the S'42 yearbook a page was devoted to Star and Crescent with its Officers and Faculty sponsors listed. The graduating class of 1970 received their Star & Crescent pins at a special ceremony.

The second high school, on Fort Moore Hill, eventually became a school for problem students, a lot of them truancy cases. By September 1948, when preparing for the school to be razed for the construction of the Hollywood Freeway, plans were made to transfer the students to Belmont High School, in the Echo Park area of Los Angeles. As Belmont students and parents protested the transfers, an alternative plan provided that 12 persons be assigned to the senior and junior high schools in the six attendance areas to carry out the program. The headquarters of the Board of Education was later built on the property. Most of Fort Moore Hill itself was removed in 1949 for the construction of the freeway, which opened in December 1950. Also located on what remains of the hill is the Fort Moore Pioneer Memorial, which was opened to the public in 1957.

On July 1, 1961, the Los Angeles City High School District and the elementary school districts were merged into the Los Angeles Unified School District. For many years, The Blue and White Daily was one of the few high school newspapers to be published Tuesday through Friday mornings during the school year except for holidays and the first 11 and last 5 days of the semester. It was a 4-page paper. In 1962, "Daily" was dropped from the name and the publication became a weekly. It is currently published monthly.

Los Angeles High School is shown in the opening credits of the 1940s movie "Strike Up The Band" and the 1943 movie "Henry Aldrich Gets Glamour". The popular late 1960s and early 1970s television series Room 222 was filmed at LAHS. The 1917 building sustained moderate cosmetic damage, principally in the tower area, during the Sylmar earthquake in 1971. Efforts spearheaded by the Alumni Association, founded in 1876, to repair and preserve the iconic structure were opposed by certain commercial interests, who lobbied for its demolition, and finally decisively thwarted when it was gutted by a fire of mysterious origin. The replacement structure has been universally decried and finds no champions among either current or former students and faculty, or residents of the neighboring community.

The school population peaked at 10,800, but overcrowding at the school has been relieved by West Adams Preparatory High School, which opened in the 2007–2008 school year. In 2009, some territory of Los Angeles High School's attendance boundary was transferred to Fairfax High School.

In February 2012, a gunman shot at teens near the high school. Two were wounded.

Neighborhoods served by LAHS
Neighborhoods zoned to LAHS include: Brookside, Harvard Heights, Koreatown, Lafayette Square, and Little Ethiopia, and portions of Hancock Park and the Pico-Union District.

Demographics
As of 2001, 75% of the student body was Hispanic and Latino. 14% was black and 7% was Asian. Other ethnic groups made up the remainder.

Academics
As of 2001 the school has the only full-time Korean language classes in LAUSD. As of that year there were over 100 students in these classes, and 80% of them were not of Korean heritage.

Advanced Placement Program
Students are accepted into the Advanced Placement Program and individual advanced placement classes based on faculty and counselor recommendations. A student may be admitted into an AP class by request if the AP instructor has approved the request.
 Biology
 Calculus AB and BC
 Chemistry
 English Language and Composition
 English Literature and Composition
 Environmental Science
 Macroeconomics
 Microeconomics
 Physics C: Mechanics
 Psychology
 Spanish Language
 Spanish Literature
 Statistics
 Studio Art Drawing, 2-D, and 3-D
 United States History
 United States Government and Politics

English Learners and Standard English Learners Program
The focus of this program is the implementation of the LAUSD 2018 Master Plan for English Learners and Standard English Learners with fidelity, so that student achievement is realized. During 2018–2019 school year 19% of the total student enrollment are students identified as English Learners, and 23% are students classified as AEA Probable Standard English Learners. At LAHS all content teachers use ELD standards. The PLDs (proficiency level descriptors) represent English language development as a part of a continuum from native language competencies to lifelong language learning. The CA ELD Standards are organized in two main sections: Section 1 provides a foundation for an orientation to the standards; Section 2 provides detailed grade level ELD standards with the corresponding CCSS-ELA. The CA ELD Standards are not taught in isolation but are used in the context of developing meaningful, intellectual interaction. The role of the Title III Coach is to collaborate with school staff in building capacity to design and deliver professional development that utilizes and aligns standards-based content with effective classroom pedagogy to increase proficiency in the area of English language arts for all students through effective first teaching.

Notable alumni

 

 Margaret Q. Adams, first female deputy sheriff in United States
 Yda Hillis Addis, translator who mysteriously disappeared
 Lou Almada, baseball player
 Mel Almada, first Mexican-American in Major League Baseball
 Jimmy Allen, NFL player, 1972–73 UCLA, 1974–77 Pittsburgh Steelers, 1978–81 Detroit Lions
 Tod Andrews, actor
 Jack Banta, NFL player
 Anne Baxter, Oscar-winning actress
 Scotty Beckett, actor
 Pauline Betz, tennis champion
 Fletcher Bowron, four-term mayor of Los Angeles 1938–53
 Ray Bradbury, science-fiction author
 Larry Brown, Dallas Cowboys, Oakland Raiders cornerback, Super Bowl XXX MVP
 Charles Bukowski, writer, poet
 John Cage, composer
 John P. Cassidy, Los Angeles City Council member, 1962–67
 Richard Chew, film editor
 Frank Chuman, civil rights attorney and author
 Johnnie Cochran, attorney who defended O. J. Simpson
 Lynn "Buck" Compton, World War II veteran portrayed in Band of Brothers, Deputy DA of Los Angeles County who convicted Sirhan Sirhan
 Gary Conway, actor
 Lillian Copeland (1904–1964), Olympic discus champion; set world records in discus, javelin, and shot put
 Harry Danning, 4x MLB All Star baseball player
 Vernon Dean, NFL player
 Mel Durslag, sportswriter
 Aileen Eaton, boxing promoter
 Bruce Edwards, actor
 Mike Evans, actor
 Robert C. Farrell (born 1936), journalist and member of the Los Angeles City Council, 1974–91
 Louise Fazenda, actress
 Lita Gaithers, Tony Award-nominee singer-songwriter
 Siedah Garrett, Grammy-winning singer-songwriter
 Marjorie Gestring, Olympian (swimming and diving)
 John M. Goddard, led first explorations by kayak down Nile and Congo Rivers
 Dave Gold, founder of 99 Cents Only Stores
 Carl Greenberg, newspaperman
 Clementina D. Griffin, educator, principal, aviator
 Horace Hahn, actor
 Juanita Hansen, silent film actress
 Aiko Herzig-Yoshinaga, activist, did not graduate due to internment in Manzanar in senior year
 Dustin Hoffman, Oscar-winning actor
 Robert Horton, actor
 Christianne Meneses Jacobs, writer, editor and founder of Iguana Magazine (nation's only Spanish-language magazine for children)
 Cornelius Johnson, Olympic champion (1936, track and field)
 Willis Lamb, shared Nobel Prize for Physics in 1955 for discoveries related to superfine structure of hydrogen spectrum
 Milt Larsen, co-founder of Magic Castle
 Piper Laurie, 3-time Oscar-nominated actress
 Homer Lea, general in army of Sun Yat-sen, writer of books of geopolitics
 Gene LeBell, stuntman 
 Linda Levi, artist
 Bessie Love, actress
 Mike Marienthal, athlete, 1990 UCLA Sports Hall of Fame
 Sam Match (1923–2010), tennis player
 Ray May, NFL player, 1967–69 Pittsburgh Steelers, 1970–73 Baltimore Colts (Super Bowl), 1973–75 Denver Broncos
 Marilyn McCoo, actress and singer
 Naida McCullough, pianist, teacher
 Bob Meusel, baseball player, New York Yankees teammate of Babe Ruth and Lou Gehrig
 Josephine Miles, poet
 Marvin Mitchelson, palimony attorney
 Carmel Myers, actress
 Jerry Nemer (1912–1980), basketball player and attorney
 Anita Ortega, basketball player, LAPD
 Budge Patty, tennis champion
 Don Paul, NFL player
 Leonard Pennario, concert pianist
 Cal Peterson, NFL player
 Emily Brown Portwig, Los Angeles clubwoman and pharmacist
 Donald Prell, futurologist
 Al Raffo, baseball player
 Madlyn Rhue, actress
 Charles Francis Richter, inventor of Richter Scale
 Frederick Madison Roberts, first African American elected to California State Legislature (1919–1933)
 Earl Scheib, auto-painting entrepreneur
 Budd Schulberg, Oscar-winning screenwriter
 Leonard Slatkin, music director of National Symphony Orchestra
 Bowen Stassforth, Olympian (silver medalist in swimming)
 Art Stoefen, basketball player
 Lester Stoefen, tennis player
 Louise Suski, newspaper editor
 Miiko Taka, actress
 George Takei, actor, known for Star Trek
 Harry Thompson, NFL player
 William Irwin Thompson, poet and cultural historian
 Kathryn Doi Todd, first Asian American female judge
 Mel Tormé, singer, songwriter and actor
 Dick Walsh, baseball and soccer executive
 Doodles Weaver, actor and comedian
 Francis J. Weber, historian, author on California's mission period
 Matt Weinstock, newspaper columnist
 Tad Wieman, college football coach
 Rosalind Wiener Wyman, political figure
 Anna May Wong, actress
 Chloé Zhao, Oscar-winning film director

Current administration
 Marguerette Gladden, Principal
 Mr. Michael Berger, Assistant Principal
 Mrs. Batia Oren, Assistant Principal
 Mr. Pacino Furioso, Assistant Principal
 Mr. Eric Fitzpatrick, Assistant Principal

See also

 Central Business District, Los Angeles (1880-1899)

References

External links

 Official Los Angeles High School website
 Official Los Angeles High School Alumni Association website

High schools in Los Angeles
Los Angeles Unified School District schools
Mid-Wilshire, Los Angeles
Public high schools in California
 
Educational institutions established in 1873
1873 establishments in California
Hancock Park, Los Angeles
Koreatown, Los Angeles
Pico-Union, Los Angeles
19th century in Los Angeles